Conus janus, common name the janus cone, is a species of sea snail, a marine gastropod mollusk in the family Conidae, the cone snails and their allies.

Like all species within the genus Conus, these snails are predatory and venomous. They can "sting" humans if handled.

Description
The size of the shell varies between 37 mm and 80 mm. The maculated spire is concavely elevated and striate. The narrow body whorl narrow has a rounded shoulder, and is distantly sulcate below. The shell is whitish or yellowish, indistinctly three-banded by yellowish brown or chestnut longitudinal markings.

Distribution
This marine species occurs in the Mascarene Basin; off Southeast India and the Philippines.

References

  Petit, R. E. (2009). George Brettingham Sowerby, I, II & III: their conchological publications and molluscan taxa. Zootaxa. 2189: 1–218
 Puillandre N., Duda T.F., Meyer C., Olivera B.M. & Bouchet P. (2015). One, four or 100 genera? A new classification of the cone snails. Journal of Molluscan Studies. 81: 1–23

External links
 The Conus Biodiversity website
 Cone Shells - Knights of the Sea
 

janus
Gastropods described in 1792